The Adventures of Father Brown is a 1945 radio crime drama that aired on the Mutual Broadcasting System, adapted from G. K. Chesterton's stories of Father Brown.

The 30-minute detective series starred Karl Swenson as Father Brown, introduced as "the best loved detective of them all." (Original plans called for "either Walter Huston or Spencer Tracy in the title role.") Bill Griffis portrayed Flambeau, and Gretchen Douglas was heard as Nora, the rectory housekeeper. The program was broadcast Sundays at 5 p.m. on Mutual from June 10, 1945, to July 29, 1945.

References

External links
Two episodes of program at archive.org
Two episodes of "Father Brown" available online from Old Time Radio Researchers group.

Adaptations of works by G. K. Chesterton
American radio dramas
1945 radio programme debuts
1945 radio programme endings
1940s American radio programs
Fictional amateur detectives
Mutual Broadcasting System programs
Detective radio shows
Radio programmes based on novels